This list is of the Historic Sites of Japan located within the Prefecture of Hiroshima.

National Historic Sites
As of 1 July 2021, twenty-nine Sites have been designated as being of national significance (including two *Special Historic Sites); the Joseon Mission Sites span the prefectural borders with Okayama and also include an area of Shizuoka.

Prefectural Historic Sites
As of 1 May 2020, one hundred and twenty-five Sites have been designated as being of prefectural importance.

Municipal Historic Sites
As of 1 May 2020, a further three hundred and fifty-two Sites have been designated as being of municipal importance.

See also

 Cultural Properties of Japan
 Bingo and Aki Provinces
 Hiroshima Prefectural Museum of History
 List of Places of Scenic Beauty of Japan (Hiroshima)
 List of Cultural Properties of Japan - paintings (Hiroshima)

References

External links
  Cultural Properties in Hiroshima Prefecture

Hiroshima Prefecture
 Hiroshima